Ramorino Glacier is the  long glacier situated northwest of upper Crosswell Glacier and southeast of Cervellati Glacier on the east slope of Sentinel Range in the Ellsworth Mountains, Antarctica. It flows northeastwards between Epperly Ridge and Shinn Ridge, and enters Crosswell Glacier northwest of Mount Segers. The feature was named by US-ACAN in 2006 after Maria Chiara Ramorino, manager of the Italian team that compiled and promulgated the SCAR Composite Gazetteer of Antarctica, 1998–2006.

Maps
 Vinson Massif.  Scale 1:250 000 topographic map.  Reston, Virginia: US Geological Survey, 1988.
 Antarctic Digital Database (ADD). Scale 1:250000 topographic map of Antarctica. Scientific Committee on Antarctic Research (SCAR). Since 1993, regularly updated.

See also
 List of glaciers in the Antarctic
 Glaciology

References

External links
 Ramorino Glacier SCAR Antarctic Gazetteer.

Glaciers of Ellsworth Land